The politics of Libya has been in an uncertain state since the collapse of the Libyan Arab Jamahiriya in 2011 and a recent civil war and various jihadists and tribal elements controlling parts of the country. On 10 March 2021, the interim Government of National Unity (GNU), unifying the Second Al-Thani Cabinet and the Government of National Accord was formed, only to face new opposition in Government of National Stability, until Libyan Political Dialogue Forum assured the ongoing ceasefire.

Libyan Political Agreement (2015) & Political Atmosphere post-2015

Members of the House of Representatives and the New General National Congress signed a political agreement on 18 December 2015. Under the terms of the agreement, a nine-member Presidential Council and a seventeen-member interim Government of National Accord was formed, with a view to holding new elections within two years. The House of Representatives would continue to exist as a legislature and an advisory body, to be known as the State Council, was formed with members nominated by the New General National Congress.

This attempt at unification was unsuccessful, as three competing governments still remained by the end of 2016, disputes between which continuing until the formation of the GNU in 2015. Still, even with the establishment of this governmental structure, widespread human rights abuses exist throughout the country to this day; this is due to the lack of a central government to regulate the ten years of conflict that ensued after Gaddafi’s reign. However, the country has made some democratic progress: Libya’s score was trending upwards from 2011 to 2013 on the PolityIV authority trends scale, increasing from a -7 to a 1, shifting its categorization from “autocracy” to “anocracy.”

House of Representatives

The House of Representatives was formed following June 2014 elections, when the General National Congress formed as a transitional body after the Libyan Revolution dissolved. However, Islamists fared poorly in the low-turnout elections, and members of the Islamist-led GNC reconvened in August 2014, refusing to recognise the new parliament dominated by secularist and federalist lawmakers. Supporters of the New General National Congress swiftly seized control of Tripoli, Libya's constitutional capital, forcing the newly elected parliament into virtual exile in Tobruk, near the Egyptian border. The House of Representatives enjoys widespread international recognition as Libya's official government. However, the Tripoli-based Supreme Court declared it illegal and voided the results of the election in November 2014. The court ruling was hailed by the GNC and its backers, but it was rejected as invalid by the House of Representatives and its loyalists.

Against this backdrop of division, the Islamic State of Iraq and the Levant and Ansar al-Sharia, as well as other militant groups both religious and tribal in nature, have seized control of several cities and districts across Libya, especially in Cyrenaica, which is theoretically under the control of the Tobruk-based government. A number of commentators have described Libya as a failed state or suggested it is on the verge of failure.

General National Congress

The General National Congress (also translated as General National Council) was the legislative authority of Libya. It was elected by popular vote on 7 July 2012, and from 8 August replaced the National Transitional Council that had governed the country since the end of the Libyan Civil War. The General National Congress was composed of 200 members of which 80 were elected through a party list system of proportional representation, and 120 were elected as independents in multiple-member districts.

The executive branch was appointed by the GNC and led by the Prime Minister, while the President of the GNC was the de facto head of state, though not explicitly described as such in the Declaration.
 
The main responsibility of the GNC was to form a constituent assembly which would write Libya's permanent constitution, for approval by a referendum. The law of Libya is based on sharia.

On 30 March 2014, the General National Congress voted to replace itself with a new House of Representatives. The new legislature would allocate 30 seats for women, would have 200 seats overall (with individuals able to run as members of political parties) and allow Libyans of foreign nationalities to run for office. While elections were held and lawmakers took office, the former General National Congress rejected the results and reconvened in opposition to the new parliament, which now meets in the eastern Libyan city of Tobruk.

In early December 2015 both parliaments, the GNC and the House of Representatives, agreed a declaration of principles calling for the formation of a joint ten-person committee to name an interim prime minister and two deputies, leading to new elections within two years.

Changes after the 2011 Civil War
Political parties were banned in Libya from 1972 until the removal of Gaddafi's government, and all elections were nonpartisan under law. However, during the revolution, the National Transitional Council (NTC), a body formed on 27 February 2011 by anti-Gaddafi forces to act as the "political face of the revolution", made the introduction of multiparty democracy a cornerstone of its agenda. In June 2011, Saif al-Islam Gaddafi said his father would agree to internationally monitored general elections, and would step down if he lost them, but his offer was refused by the rebels and ignored by the UN Security Council.

On 8 March, the NTC issued a statement in which it declared itself to be the "sole representative all over Libya".
The council formed an interim governing body on 23 March. As of 20 October 100 countries declared full support to the council by severing all relations with Gaddafi's rule and recognizing the National Transitional Council as the rightful representative of Libya.

On 3 August 2011, the NTC issued a Constitutional Declaration which declared the statehood of Libya as a democracy with Islam as its state religion, in which the state guarantees the rule of law and an independent judiciary as well as civic and human basic rights (including freedom of religion and women's rights), and which contains provisions for a phase of transition to a presidential republic with an elected national assembly and a democratically legitimized constitution by 2013. Vice Chairman Abdul Hafiz Ghoga declared Libya to be "liberated" on 23 October 2011, announcing an official end to the war. Chairman Mustafa Abdul Jalil said Libya would become an Islamic democracy in the wake of Gaddafi's death, though the extent of Islamic law's influence would be determined by elected lawmakers. Ghoga later confirmed that Libya will continue to adhere to all international agreements to which it was signatory prior to the uprising.

On 7 July 2012 an election was held for the General National Congress (GNC) to replace the NTC. There were 2,501 candidates for the 200 seats - 136 for political parties and 64 for independent candidates. About 300 candidates' views were considered unacceptable and removed from candidates list, suspected of sympathizing with the defeated forces of the Jamahiriya. Accreditation centers have also been organized in European cities with larger Libyan communities like Berlin and Paris, in order to allow Libyan nationals there to cast their vote. On 8 August 2012 the NTC officially dissolved and transferred power to the General National Congress.

Political parties and elections

On 7 July 2012, the Legislative body – the General National Congress – was elected.

List of parties with seats in the General National Congress 
 National Forces Alliance
 Justice & Construction
 National Front
 Wadi al-Hiya Alliance
 Union for Homeland
 National Centrist Party
 Libyan National Democratic Party
 The Message
 The Foundation
 National Party For Development and Welfare
 Nation & Prosperity
 Authenticity & Renewal
 Authenticity & Progress
 Moderate Umma Assembly
 Libik Watani
 National Gathering of Wadi al-Shati
 Moderate Youth Party
 Libyan List for Freedom & Development
 National Coalition of Parties
 Libya the Hope
 Wisdom Party

List of parties without seats in the General National Congress 
 Libyan Popular National Movement
 Democratic Party
 Homeland Party
 Party of Reform and Development
 Libyan Constitutional Union
 Libyan Amazigh Congress
 Alhaq and Democracy Party of Benghazi
 Libyan National Congress Party
 New Libya Party
 National Unity of Libya Party
 Freedom and Development Party of Libya
 The Patriotic Reform Party
 National Solidarity Party
 The Libyan National Party
 Umma Party
 Justice and Democracy Party of Libya
 Libya Future Party
 Libyan Center Party
 National Democratic Assembly for Justice and Progress
 Libya Development Party
 Libyan Universal Party
 National Democratic Alliance
 New National Congress Party
 Tawasul Party
 Libyan National Democratic Party for Justice and Development
 Libya Our Home and Tribe Party
 Libyan Liberation Party
 Libya for All Party
Popular Front for the Liberation of Libya
 Unity Movement
 Democratic Youth Party
 National Democratic Assembly
 Wefaq Party
 Libyan National Democratic Assemblage
 Ansar Al Horria
 Libyan Unionist Party

International organization participation

The National Transitional Council has pledged to honor Libya's international commitments until the 2012 elections.

Libya is a member of ABEDA, AfDB, AFESD, AL, AMF, AMU, AU, CAEU, ECA, FAO, G-77, IAEA, IBRD, ICAO, IDA, IDB, IFAD, IFC, IFRCS, ILO, IMF, IMO, Inmarsat, Intelsat, Interpol, IOC, ISO, ITU, MONUC, NAM, OAPEC, OIC, OPEC, PCA, UN, UNCTAD, UNESCO, UNHRC (suspended), UNIDO, UPU, WCO, WFTU, WHO, WIPO, WMO, UNWTO and UNHABITAT.

Libyan politics under Muammar Gaddafi

After originally rising to power through a military coup d'état in 1969, Colonel Muammar Gaddafi's governance of Libya became increasingly centric on the teachings of his Green Book, which he published in the mid-1970s chapter by chapter as a foundation for a new form of government. This jamahiriya, as he called it, was supposedly a form of direct democracy in which power was balanced between a General People's Congress, consisting of 2,700 representatives of Basic People's Congresses, and an executive General People's Committee, headed by a General Secretary, who reported to the Prime Minister and the President. However, Gaddafi retained virtually all power, continuing to operate and control vestiges of the military junta put in place in 1969.

Gaddafi’s authoritarian rule, a transition from the former monarchical structure, aligns with Samuels’ finding that most military coups spark change from one form of non-democratic government to another. Gaddafi acted as a military/personalist leader during his 42-year reign, nearly tripling the average ruling length of 15.1 years for this regime type, as found by political scientist Barbara Geddes in her 1999 publication. Still, Gaddafi’s regime did follow many of the military/personalist tropes that Geddes outlined: failing after its leader's death, relying on unstable personal networks to rule, and facing military opposition during the reign. 

The Libyan revolt of 2011 that ultimately ended Gaddafi’s reign was partially inspired by both Tunisia and Egypt’s attempted democratization, demonstrating the neighborhood effect: a theory that postulates countries will be influenced by their neighbors when adopting regime types.

Wanted figures

Interpol on 4 March 2011 issued a security alert concerning the "possible movement of dangerous individuals and assets" based on United Nations Security Council Resolution 1970, which imposed a travel ban and asset freeze. The warning lists Gaddafi himself and 15 key members of his government:
 Muammar Gaddafi: Responsibility for ordering repression of demonstrations, human rights abuses. *Killed 20 October 2011 in Sirte*
 Dr. Baghdadi Mahmudi: Head of the Liaison Office of the Revolutionary Committees.  Revolutionary Committees involved in violence against demonstrators.
 Abuzed Omar Dorda: Director, External Security Organisation. Government loyalist. Head of external intelligence agency.
 Major General Abu-Bakr Yunis Jabr: Defense Minister. Overall responsibility for actions of armed forces.
 Ayesha Gaddafi: Daughter of Muammar Gaddafi. Closeness of association with government.
 Hannibal Muammar Gaddafi:  Son of Muammar Gaddafi. Closeness of association with government.
 Mutassim Gaddafi: National Security Adviser. Son of Muammar Gaddafi. Closeness of association with government
 Al-Saadi Gaddafi: Commander Special Forces. Son of Muammar Gaddafi. Closeness of association with government. Command of military units involved in repression of demonstrations.
 Saif al-Islam Gaddafi: Director, Gaddafi Foundation. Son of Muammar Gaddafi. Closeness of association with government. Inflammatory public statements encouraging violence against demonstrators.
 Abdulqader Yusef Dibri: Head of Muammar Gaddafi's personal security. Responsibility for government security. History of directing violence against dissidents.
 Matuq Mohammed Matuq: Secretary for Utilities. Senior member of government. Involvement with Revolutionary Committees. Past history of involvement in suppression of dissent and violence.
 Sayyid Mohammed Qadhaf Al-dam: Cousin of Muammar Gaddafi. In the 1980s, Sayyid was involved in the dissident assassination campaign and allegedly responsible for several deaths in Europe. He is also thought to have been involved in arms procurement.
 Khamis Gaddafi: Son of Muammar Gaddafi. Closeness of association with government. Command of military units involved in repression of demonstrations.
 Muhammad Gaddafi: Son of Muammar Gaddafi. Closeness of association with government.
 Saif al-Arab Gaddafi: Son of Muammar Gaddafi. Closeness of association with government.
 Colonel Abdullah Senussi: Director Military Intelligence. Military Intelligence involvement in suppression of demonstrations. Past history includes suspicion of involvement in Abu Selim prison massacre. Convicted in absentia for bombing of UTA flight. Brother-in-law of Muammar Gaddafi.

The NTC has been in negotiations with Algeria and Niger, neighboring countries to which members of the government and defecting military commanders have fled, attempting to secure the arrest and extradition of Al-Saadi Gaddafi and others.

Of these officials, Baghdadi Mahmudi and Abuzed Omar Dorda were arrested, while Saif al-Arab Gaddafi was killed by a NATO airstrike during the war, Khamis Gaddafi was killed in action after the fall of Tripoli, and Muammar and Mutassim Gaddafi, as well as Abu-Bakr Yunis Jabr, were killed during the fall of Sirte.

See also
Green Resistance
General People's Committee of Libya
List of diplomatic missions of Libya

References

External links
"Gaddafi Plays Quietly, But He's Still in the Game," The New York Times, 17 March 1991
Chief of state and cabinet members , ''CIA Factbook, as of 17 March 2010